The Italian ambassador in Sofia is the official representative of the Government in Rome to the Government of Bulgaria.

History
In the period preceding the liberation of Bulgaria from Ottoman rule, Italian Consulates were already active in the main cities of the country - Plovdiv, Ruse and Sofia. After the end of the Russo-Turkish War of 1877-1878, Italy maintained its Consulates in the first two centres and opened new ones in the ports of Lom (1881), Varna (1889) and Burgas (1903).

On 25 December 1879 in the Royal Palace of Sofia, Domenico Brunenghi solemnly presented his credentials to Prince Alexander I of Bulgaria.

List of representatives 
<onlyinclude>

References 

 
Bulgaria
Italy